Ronald Eldon Sexsmith (born January 8, 1964) is a Canadian singer-songwriter from St. Catharines, Ontario. He was the songwriter of the year at the 2005 Juno Awards. He began releasing recordings of his own material in 1985 at age 21, and has since recorded seventeen albums. He was the subject of a 2010 documentary called Love Shines.

Early life
Sexsmith grew up in St. Catharines and started his own band when he was 14 years old.

Career
Sexsmith was seventeen when he started playing at a bar, the Lion's Tavern, in his hometown. He gained a reputation as "The One-Man Jukebox" for his aptitude in playing requests. However, he gradually began to include original songs and more obscure music, which his audience did not favour. He decided to start writing songs after the birth of his first child in 1985. That same year, still living in St. Catharines, he collaborated on recording and releasing a cassette, Out of the Duff, with a singer-songwriter friend named Claudio. Side one of the cassette contained five songs written and performed by Sexsmith; side two featured Claudio.

A year later, Sexsmith and his family moved to Toronto, living in an apartment in The Beaches neighbourhood. Sexsmith recorded and released the full-length cassette There's a Way, which was produced by Kurt Swinghammer. Meanwhile, he worked as a courier and befriended Bob Wiseman, whom he met at an open stage. They became friends, and Wiseman agreed to produce and arrange Sexsmith's next release in between his tours with the band Blue Rodeo. Because of Wiseman's busy schedule, work on the album stretched out over several years.

After the album Grand Opera Lane was rejected by several Canadian labels, the pair released it independently in 1991. Grand Opera Lane was credited to "Ron Sexsmith and the Uncool"; the backing band including Don Kerr and Steve Charles, and also featured Sarah McElcheran (horn arrangements) and Kim Ratcliffe on electric guitar. Attention garnered by the song "Speaking with the Angel", Sexsmith earned a contract that led to his self-titled album in 1995. The record was praised by Elvis Costello, for whom Sexsmith later opened.

Between 1997 and 2001, Sexsmith released three more albums, and then Cobblestone Runway in 2002. Retriever, his next album, is a more pop-oriented album and is dedicated to Elliott Smith and Johnny Cash. Sexsmith performed in the Toronto area in support of these albums.

On May 1, 2001, Sexsmith performed "Just My Heart Talkin'" on the BBC's Later... with Jools Holland musical showcase, alongside R.E.M., Orbital, India.Arie, and Clearlake. Holland backed him on piano. It was his second appearance on the show. He began to have some radio success, particularly on Canadian adult-oriented radio.

In 2002, Sexsmith recorded a cover version of "This Is Where I Belong", the title track for a tribute album called This Is Where I Belong – The Songs of Ray Davies and the Kinks, which included contributions from Damon Albarn, Bebel Gilberto, and Queens of the Stone Age, among others. In 2006, he performed at the Halifax Pop Explosion. In 2004, he performed at the RuhrTriennale in the concert series Century of Song hosted by Bill Frisell.

On June 16, 2011, Sexsmith and his band performed The Kinks' song "Misfits" with Ray Davies at the Meltdown Festival in London, England. The same year, he won a songwriter of the year Juno Award for "Whatever It Takes" and a Canadian Indy Award. The album Long Player Late Bloomer was shortlisted for the Polaris Music Prize. Sexsmith's 14th full-length album, Carousel One, was released in March 2015.

In 2017, Sexsmith published his debut novel, Deer Life, through Dundurn Press. It was well received and Publishers Weekly wrote that the "novel has much the same effect as his music, conveying uncertainty with fearlessness and heart."

Collaborations and covers
Sexsmith has collaborated with many artists. In 2002, he sang a duet with Coldplay's Chris Martin in the song "Gold in Them Hills", which appeared as a bonus track on the album Cobblestone Runway. Sexsmith sang on "An Elephant Insect", which appears on the 2003 Shonen Knife album Heavy Songs. In 2005, he released a collection of songs recorded with drummer Don Kerr during the production of Retriever, called Destination Unknown. Also in 2005, Sexsmith sang on the track "Song No. 6" by Norwegian singer-songwriter Ane Brun, which appeared on her album A Temporary Dive and again on her Duets album later the same year. In 2006, he performed a duet of "So Long Marianne" with Leonard Cohen in Yorkville, Toronto. In 2014, he wrote and sang a duet together with Dutch singer-songwriter Marike Jager, the song "Don't you", featured on her album The Silent Song.

Sexsmith's songs have been performed and recorded by a number of well-known musicians, including Elvis Costello, Feist, Rod Stewart, and Emmylou Harris His song "Secret Heart" has been covered by Rod Stewart, Feist, and Nick Lowe. Sexsmith co-wrote "Brandy Alexander" with Feist—versions appear on Sexsmith's Exit Strategy of the Soul and on Feist's album The Reminder.  A version of Sexsmith's "Whatever It Takes" appeared on Michael Bublé's 2009 album Crazy Love.

In 2004, fellow Canadian singer-songwriter k.d. lang covered Sexsmith's song "Fallen" on her album Hymns of the 49th Parallel.

In 2010, Sexsmith appeared on "Liberace", a track off the album Vaudeville by Canadian rapper D-Sisive. In 2012 his song "Gold in them Hills" was included on Katie Melua's album Secret Symphony, and "Right About Now" was covered by Mari Wilson on the album "Cover Stories".

In 2012, Sexsmith appeared on Lowe Country: The Songs of Nick Lowe, a Nick Lowe tribute album, where he covered Lowe's 1994 song "Where's My Everything?"

Sexsmith sang the lead vocals on a song from Ryan Granville-Martin's 2013 album, Mouthparts and Wings, which features a different vocalist on each song.

Sexsmith was featured on vocals on the Mel Parsons song "Don't Wait" from her 2015 album Drylands.

Writing
Sexsmith published a book on September 16, 2017, called Deer Life. It has been described as a "grown up fairy tale" by Sexsmith himself. It is the artist's first effort as an author.

Personal life
Sexsmith has two children (Christopher and Evelyne) with his common-law partner, Jocelyne. Their fifteen-year relationship ended in 2001.

Sexsmith's wife, Colleen Hixenbaugh, is also a musician. She is a member of By Divine Right, half of the duo Jack and Ginger, and the duo Colleen and Paul with Paul Linklater.

Discography

Albums
 1986: There's a Way (Self-released cassette)
 1991: Grand Opera Lane (Linus Entertainment; produced by Bob Wiseman; with The Uncool)
 1995: Ron Sexsmith (Interscope/Warner; produced by Mitchell Froom & Daniel Lanois)
 1997: Other Songs (Interscope/Warner; Tchad Blake & Mitchell Froom)
 1999: Whereabouts (Interscope/Warner; Tchad Blake & Mitchell Froom))
 2001: Blue Boy (Cooking Vinyl; produced by Steve Earle and Ray Kennedy)
 2002: Cobblestone Runway (Nettwerk; produced by Martin Terefe)
 2003: Rarities (Linus Entertainment)
 2004: Retriever (Warner; produced by Martin Terefe)
 2005: Destination Unknown (V2, with Don Kerr, released as Sexsmith & Kerr)
 2006: Time Being (Warner; produced by Mitchell Froom; also released in 2007 by Coppertree Records UK on 180g vinyl)
 2008: Exit Strategy of the Soul (Yep Roc; produced by Martin Terefe)
 2011: Long Player Late Bloomer (Thirty Tigers/Cooking Vinyl; produced by Bob Rock)
 2013: Forever Endeavour (Cooking Vinyl; produced by Mitchell Froom)
 2015: Carousel One (Compass Records; produced by Jim Scott)
 2017: The Last Rider (Compass Records)
 2020: Hermitage (Cooking Vinyl; produced by Don Kerr)
 2023: The Vivian Line (Cooking Vinyl)

Other contributions
 1995: For the Love of Harry: Everybody Sings Nilsson – "Good Ol' Desk"
 1999: Bleecker Street: Greenwich Village in the 60's – "Reason to Believe"
 2002: This Is Where I Belong – The Songs of Ray Davies & The Kinks – "This Is Where I Belong"
 2002: WYEP Live and Direct: Volume 4 – On Air Performances – "Just My Heart Talking"
 2002: Maybe This Christmas – "Maybe This Christmas"
 2003: Beautiful: A Tribute to Gordon Lightfoot – "Drifters"
 2004: Beautiful Dreamer – The Songs of Stephen Foster – "Comrades Fill No Glass for Me"
 2006: Our Power – "Love Henry" (with Don Kerr)
 2008: Northern Songs: Canada's Best and Brightest – "All in Good Time"
 2008: Redeye 2008 Holiday Sampler – "Something to Hold on to (At Christmas)"
 2009: Crayon Angel: A Tribute to the Music of Judee Sill – "Crayon Angel"
 2011: Harrison Covered: MOJO presents an Exclusive Tribute to George – "Give Me Love" (15-song CD given away free with MOJO magazine November 2011 issue)
 2011: This One's for Him: A Tribute to Guy Clark – "Broken Hearted People"
 2012: Textuality OST – "Since I Don't Have You"
 2012: Lowe Country: The Songs of Nick Lowe – "Where's My Everything"

The Kelele Brothers
 Escape from Bover County (Gas Station Recordings)
 Has-Beens & Wives (Gas Station Recordings)

References

External links

 
 

1964 births
Living people
Canadian folk-pop singers
Canadian male singer-songwriters
Canadian folk singer-songwriters
Best Original Song Genie and Canadian Screen Award winners
Juno Award for Adult Alternative Album of the Year winners
Musicians from St. Catharines
Juno Award for Songwriter of the Year winners
Juno Award for Roots & Traditional Album of the Year – Solo winners